The Museum of Ancient Ships is a museum in Pisa, Tuscany, Italy.
The museum exhibits ancient ships and artifacts.  
The exhibition space is within the ancient halls of the Medici Arsenals.

Some museum items

See also 
Ancient shipbuilding techniques

Sources

External links
 

Museums in Tuscany
Maritime museums in Italy
Pisa